The International Whaling Commission meeting in 2005 was held in Ulsan, South Korea from 20 June–24 June 2005.  This meeting saw discussion and vote upon several particularly divisive matters. Notable among them were three defeated Japanese proposals:
 A proposal to have secret ballot voting. Many watchers of the Commission interpreted this proposal as designed to allow Japan's protégé member states to vote in a way that was less transparent. (Vote held on 20 June 2005)
 A proposal to re-institute commercial whaling, which would have required a three quarters majority to carry the vote, was defeated 29 votes to 23 against (Vote held on 21 June 2005)
 A proposal to remove a decade old Southern Ocean whale sanctuary, which was defeated 30 votes against 25 (Vote held on 22 June 2005)

Responding to Japan's stated intentions of increasing their scientific whaling quota, Australia also introduced a non-binding resolution that calls on Japan to halt the expansion of its scientific whaling program, which was supported by 30 votes to 25 (Vote held on  22 June 2005).  Opponents of scientific whaling claim it is commercial whaling under a different name. New Zealand's Minister of Conservation, Chris Carter, said, "We find (the) whole use of the phrase 'scientific whaling' an outrage."  Japan, however, claims that their research activities contribute to scientific knowledge of the management of whales. In the face of these setbacks, Japan has not ruled out withdrawing from the IWC, but this would require approval by the Japanese parliament.

References

2005 in economics
2005 in law
2005 in the environment
International Whaling Commission